Elta Cartwright (December 21, 1907 – November 29, 2001) was an American sprinter. She competed in the women's 100 metres at the 1928 Summer Olympics.

References

External links
 

1907 births
2001 deaths
Athletes (track and field) at the 1928 Summer Olympics
American female sprinters
Olympic track and field athletes of the United States
Sportspeople from Eureka, California
USA Outdoor Track and Field Championships winners
20th-century American women
Olympic female sprinters